Saveetha Engineering College is a co-educational  Institution. The College is affiliated with Anna University, Chennai, the largest technical university in India. Saveetha Engineering College is granted Autonomous status by University Grants Commission (UGC)., Affiliated to Anna University located in Chennai, India. It was founded in 2001 by the Saveetha Medical and Educational Trust, a registered charitable society. Approved by the All India Council for Technical Education (AICTE), a statutory body of the Government of India, and also by the Government of Tamil Nadu. The campus is facing Chembarambakkam lake on the Chennai-Bangalore National Highway (NH4), Thandalam, Kancheepuram District, Chennai, Pin: 602105.

References

All India Council for Technical Education
Engineering colleges in Chennai
Educational institutions established in 2001
2001 establishments in Tamil Nadu